Sequis Centre Tower is a  tall skyscraper at Sudirman Central Business District, South Jakarta, Indonesia. This is a LEED Platinum building. The design of the tower is inspired from the Banyan tree with a bundle of four towers, with gardens on the roof featuring typical local plants. To reduce the amount of energy, Sequis Tower has adopted the design of shading fins that can compensate for solar radiation on the building facade. Sequis Tower’s open plaza has pedestrian access to Pacific Place, The Alila Hotel, Jakarta Stock Exchange, Bapindo Towers, Sequis Center, The Energy Tower, Graha CIMB Niaga and MRT Jakarta’s Istora station. The tower is topped off in March, 2017.

See also
List of tallest buildings in Indonesia
 List of tallest buildings in Jakarta

References

Towers in Indonesia
Buildings and structures in Jakarta
Skyscrapers in Indonesia
Post-independence architecture of Indonesia
Skyscraper office buildings in Indonesia

Leadership in Energy and Environmental Design platinum certified buildings
Kohn Pedersen Fox buildings